Cyperus congensis is a species of sedge that is endemic to parts of western and central Africa.

The species was first formally described by the botanist Charles Baron Clarke in 1896.

See also
 List of Cyperus species

References

congensis
Taxa named by Charles Baron Clarke
Plants described in 1896
Flora of Togo
Flora of Sierra Leone
Flora of Benin
Flora of Gabon
Flora of Ivory Coast
Flora of Liberia
Flora of Senegal